This is a list of diplomatic missions in Niger. At present, the capital city of Niamey hosts more than 22 embassies.

Embassies 
Niamey

Other posts in Niamey 
 (Delegation)

Consulates 
Agadez

Niamey
 (Consulate-General)
 (Consulate-General)

Gallery

Non-resident embassies 

 (Abuja)
 (Abuja)
 (Algiers)
 (Cairo)
 (Cairo)
 (Abuja)
 (Abuja)
 (Tripoli)
 (Algiers)
 (N'Djamena)
 (Abuja)
 (Abidjan)
 (Paris)
 (Cairo)
 (Paris)
 (Tripoli)
 (Abuja)
 (Ouagadougou)
 (Dakar)
 (Abuja)
 (Tripoli)
 (Abuja)
  (Abidjan)
 (Abidjan)
 (Abuja)
 (Tripoli)
 (Valletta)
 (Riyadh)
 (Abuja)
 (Accra)
 (Ouagadougou)
 (Bamako)
 (Abuja)
 (Tunis)
 (Tripoli)
 (Cairo)
 (Abuja)
 (Abuja)
 (New York City)
 (Abuja)
 (Abuja)
 (Abuja)
 (Abuja)
 (Abuja)
 (Abuja)
 (Bamako)
 (Algiers)

Former embassies

See also 
 Foreign relations of Niger
 List of diplomatic missions of Niger

References

External links 
 Embassy Finder

Foreign relations of Niger
Diplomatic missions
Niger